The Stone Zoo (Zoologico de Piedra in Spanish) is a collection of more than 400 animal and people sculptures in rock in Alto de Boquerón, Yateras, Cuba. It is the only stone zoo in the world.

History
In 1977, the self-taught sculptor Ángel Íñigo Blanco (1935-2014) quit his coffee-picking job and started to chisel rocks in the natural park. His son Ángel Íñigo Pérez took on the project.

The Stone Zoo was declared Cultural Patrimony of Cuba on June 26, 1985. The Stone Zoo is part of the Cuchillas del Toa biosphere reserve.

References

External links
Official website

Sculpture gardens, trails and parks in North America
Outdoor sculptures in Cuba
Buildings and structures in Guantánamo
1977 establishments in Cuba
20th-century architecture in Cuba